Gandhi Institute of Technology and Management (GITAM) is a private deemed university located in Visakhapatnam, Andhra Pradesh. Founded by the late Dr M. V. V. S. Murthi in 1980 in Visakhapatnam, it also has campus in Hyderabad and Bengaluru. It was previously affiliated with Andhra University under the name GITAM College, then gained autonomy status in the year 2007. GITAM is the first private engineering institute in the state to receive the University status.  

The campus in Visakhapatnam is the oldest of the bunch. It spreads across a little over 100 acres. Collectively, the three campuses have 19 institutions under their wing.

Campuses

Visakhapatnam 
Located on the shores of Rushikonda Beach, the Visakhapatnam campus was established in 1980. The campus is home to over 6000 students, offering 6 auditoriums, 5 hostels for boys and 3 for girls.

Hyderabad 

The GITAM Hyderabad campus was established in 2009 and has six schools - School of Technology, Hyderabad Business School, School of Pharmacy, School of Architecture, School of Science and School of Humanities & amp; Social Sciences. The co-curricular and extra-curricular activities create a platform for various student bodies and chapters such as Indian Society for Technical Education, IEEE, Computer Society of India, IETE, IEI, ISOI and Engineers Without Borders. The campus hostel has 2 blocks each, for girls and boys with other student support services. They can accommodate 1600 students.

Bengaluru 
The GITAM Bengaluru campus was established in 2012 and is located near the IT hub of the city. The campus is provided with smart classrooms, laboratories, auditoria, seminar halls, playfields, student hostels and other student support services. This campus consists of three schools: GITAM School of Technology, GITAM School of Business – Bengaluru and GITAM School of Science.

Academics

Visakhapatnam campus 
 School of Gandhian Studies
 School of Architecture 
 School of Law
 Institute of Technology
 Institute of Science
 Institute of Medical Sciences and Research 
 Institute of Management
 Institute of Pharmacy
 Institute of Nursing
 Institute of Management

Hyderabad campus 
 School of Technology

GST established the Mechanical and Civil branches in 2010. The institute offers 9 UG, 6 PG, and 2 integrated dual degree programs in all engineering disciplines.

 Hyderabad Business School

GITAM HBS offers a Trimester-based two-year full-time MBA Program, M.Phil., and Ph.D. in management as well as the undergraduate programs: BBA, BBA (Financial Markets) in collaboration with NSE Academy, BBA with CIMA, BBA with ACCA.

 School of Science (GSS)
 School of Pharmacy (GSP)
 School of Architecture

GSA Hyderabad is established from the academic year 2018–19 to provide world-class education in architecture. The school offers a five-year Bachelor of Architecture (B.Arch.) program. The school provides facilities like modern laboratories in the core of architecture education i.e., Climatology lab, computer lab, building materials museum, construction yard, art studio & model-making studio.

 School of Humanities & Social Sciences (GSHS)
 Kautilya School of Public Policy (KSPP)

Accreditations and rankings 

GITAM is ranked as a Category-‘I’ University by the Ministry of Human Resource Development, Govt. of India. It’s also accredited by the NAAC with an ‘A+’ grade and is ranked 67th in the University category in NIRF Ranking 2021 of MHRD.

GITAM Institute of Technology and Management is ranked 67th among universities in India by the National Institutional Ranking Framework (NIRF) in 2021 and in the 101–150 band in the overall category. In 2019, The Week & Hansa Research’s best B-School survey ranked GITAM’s Hyderabad Business School as 5th[10] in top B-schools in Hyderabad and 20th in the Southern zone.

Student activities 
GITAM is a host to many student activities both professional and cultural. GITAM University Science & Activity Centre, professional societies include ASME, SAE, Indian Society for Technical Education, IEEE, Computer Society of India, IETE, IEI, ISOI and Engineers Without Borders. Cultural societies include Kalakriti, G-studio, G-Mag, E-Cell, Toastmasters International, National Cadet Corps, National Service Scheme and other community services like Rotaract and Vivan.

References

External links 
 

Deemed universities in Andhra Pradesh
Educational institutions established in 1980
1980 establishments in Andhra Pradesh
Universities and colleges in Visakhapatnam
Gandhi Institute of Technology and Management